Calisher is a surname. Notable people with the surname include:

Charles Calisher, American virologist
Hortense Calisher (1911–2009), American writer